Rick Witter & the Dukes are a British alternative rock band from York, England.

Band members
 Rick Witter (Vocals)
 Rob Wilson (Guitars)
 Stuart Fletcher (Bass)
 Matt Lunn (Drums)

History
In August 2005, former Shed Seven front man, Rick Witter, announced details of his new band, Rick Witter & The Dukes, along with a week of low key concerts in Scotland. The initial plan for The Dukes was to mix playing brand new material together with a few old Shed Seven songs in an effort not to alienate Witter's existing fanbase from the days with his former band. His new outfit maintained the guitar rock stylings of his predecessor, but added a harder, rockier edge.

Two sold out shows at Fibbers, in York, followed the handful of Scottish dates in December of the same year. The same month also saw the first airing of Dukes material online, as four song excerpts began streaming on a newly created Rick Witter & the Dukes MySpace page (which was later to become the band's official website). The four short demos included the tracks; "He Was the Boy Who Waited So Long He Forgot What He Was Waiting For", "Pull Together", "The Devil Will Be Waiting For You" and "The Other Way Around". 

By April 2006, the Dukes had announced a full 18-date UK tour, as well as making a further demo available to download for free, titled "The Sky Falls Down". In July 2006, the band began recording sessions for their self-financed debut album in Leeds with record producer, Will Jackson, initially slated for release in late 2006. In August of the same year, the band went on to headline the Beached Festival in Scarborough, whilst their debut album The Year of the Rat was finally released in April 2007 via Hookline and Singer/Notting Hill Music.  Five of the album's tracks feature fellow York musicians, Chris Helme and John Hargreaves of the Yards, on backing vocals and piano, whilst one track features the additional vocals of the Leeds-based jazz musician, Kate Peters. The LP itself is dedicated to the memory of Roger Witter, Rick's father.

Initial copies of the album came in the form of a special limited edition, presented in an embossed metal tin with card slip case and fold out lyric poster, and limited to 1,000 units.  To celebrate the album's release, the band announced a special one-off gig aboard a boat on York's River Ouse, known as the Ouse Cruise, as the band played a set consisting entirely of their own material to 70 fans.

Discography

Albums
The Year of The Rat (2007)

References

External links
Witter's official website

English rock music groups
Musicians from York
Musical groups established in 2005
English alternative rock groups